Claudio Chillemi (Catania, May 11, 1964) is an Italian writer, author of short stories, novels and plays for children.

Debut 

He published his first book of poems, La Voce Della Memori (The Voice of Memory) in 1990 by CDE. In 1992, the same publishing house released the short story collection C'è Qualcuno La fuori? (There Someone Out There?). These are the years of his collaboration with Zap, a non-professional magazine, and also of his commitment as a writer of comic books which climaxed with two of his publications: Antehac 20.87 (1994, Omega Press) and Il Tocco Dell'Innocenza (The Touch of Innocence) [1994, released by same publishing house].

The first theatrical experience and literary achievements 

In the mid-nineties he began writing for the theater with works intended for a teenage audience. Director and author of numerous works, he won the "Concorso Nazionale Teatro e Natura" (National Theatre and Nature Competition) twice. In the year 2000 he won the award "Arte Per La Pace" (Arts For Peace) for a school drama. In the same year he received the prestigious Giovannino Guareschi  Award for his story "L'Ultima Visita" (The Last Visit). Because of this recognition, his work was then published in the prestigious Journal of "Parma". In 2003, thanks to his theatrical experience, he published the essay book Fare Teatro A Scuole (Doing Drama in School) [L'Almanacco Editore_ Publisher], in which, among other things, there is an appendix that contains all his plays for children. This is one of his most famous books, largely because it was unique in the educational publishing sector in which rarely theatrical/drama topics are addressed. In this book he suggests the idea of a drama class, where teachers and pupils recite their roles in a sort of Pirandello-like tone role-play. The essay has been taken up and quoted by specialized websites .

The Frederick II novel 

'Federico Il Piccolo Grande Re (Frederick The Little Great King) [L'Amanacco Editore_Publisher] is a novel released in 2005 that immediately became an award finalist of "Premio Italia". A mix between history and legend, the novel narrates the youth of King Frederick II of Swabia in a medieval Sicily full of intrigue and mythological presences. The result of a long and thorough historical and mythological research, the story focuses on some facts and events which happened to and around the young Swabian ruler at the end of the year 1201, when a German adventurer named Markwald Anweiler unsuccessfully tried to seize the kingdom of Sicily. In September 2010 he released a new version of the novel, with four more chapters, published by Edizioni Della Vigna, where the author gives more space to the story of magic and adventure, without neglecting the historical references that characterized the first version .

 Science fiction and fantasy 

In parallel you also can find his works in science fiction. In fact, in 2001, he was already among the founders, together with Enrico Di Stefano, of the publication Fondazione SF Magazine. This magazine received the award of the best Italian Science Fiction fanzine in Fiuggiin in 2006, 2008 and 2010. In 2009 he was honored with the "Premio Italia" award with the short story "Guardia Medica" (Night Doctor), that had already appeared on the "Fondazione SF Magazine" no. 14. In 2009 he also published the novel Kronos (Ed. Della Vigna_Publisher ), a sci-fi mystery, where you find old investigative methods and new technologies, exploring a future in which a powerful corporation holds in its hands the destiny of the world. The novel has been greeted positively by the public  and reviewers  so as to persuade Chillemi to write and publish a short story sequel "Il Lato Oscuro Di Kronos" (The Dark Side of Kronos)  which in 2011 won in "the best story category in an amateur publication" award of "Premio Italia". The story was to be resumed in 2011 by putting it in an anthology of the same title, set in the universe of Kronos, published by Ed.Della Vigna .

Earlier in  2010, he won the Special Jury Prize in the J. Verne competition, with his tale "Ho Visitato un Cimitero di Alieni" (I visited a cemetery of Aliens) and the "Premio Italia Award" for his essay "Star Trek Lo Scisma" (Star Trek The Schism) published in an amateur publication (fanzine, Fondazione SF Magazine no. 15), wherein he analyzed and reviewed the latest Star Trek movie. Very active in Fantasy and Science Fiction (with many contributions as a Star Trek'' fan writer and essayist of the popular television series), he is present in magazines, anthologies and websites with numerous stories, poems, articles and essays. Among his activities you'll note the organization of a cultural event, thanks to him, of the idea and realization of the first Aetnacon, a Science Fiction and Fantasy convention, held between 25 and 26 September 2010, in Catania at the Botanical Garden (which, in 2011 was followed by a second convention). The convention had the English writer Ian Watson, the essayist and novelist Roberto Quaglia, and the publisher Ugo Malaguti and Donato Altomare as guests of honor.

References 

 1990. La Voce della Memoria ed. CDE (Poesie)
 1992. C'é Qualcuno là Fuori? ed. CDE (Racconti)
 1994. Antehac 20.87 ed. Omega Press (Fumetto)
 1994. Il Tocco dell'Innocenza ed. Omega Press (Fumetto)
 2000. L'Ultima Visita ed. La Gazzetta di Parma (Racconto vincitore del Premio Guareschi)
 2003. Fare Teatro A Scuola ed. L'Almanacco (Saggio)
 2004. Federico Piccolo Grande Re ed. L'Almanacco (Romanzo)
 2009. Kronos ed. Della Vigna (Romanzo)
 2010. Federico la Favolosa Infanzia di un Sovrano Leggendario ed. Della Vigna (Romanzo)
 2011. Il Lato Oscuro della Kronos ed. Della Vigna (Racconti).

21st-century Italian novelists
Living people
Year of birth missing (living people)